Nemanja Jelesijevic (born 1 July 1979) is a Serbian former professional basketball player.

Euroleague career statistics

|-
| style="text-align:left;"| 2001–02
| style="text-align:left;"| Krka
| 7 || 0 || 5:59 || .455 || .000 || .625 || 1.0 || 0.1 || 0.1 || .1 || 2.1 || 0.7

References

External links
 Profile at eurobasket.com
 Profile at fibaeurope.com
 Profile at africatopsports.com
 Profile at euroleague.net
 Profile at basket.krka.si
 Profile at kosarka24.com

1979 births
Living people
Hapoel Galil Elyon players
KK Crvena zvezda players
KK Krka players
KK Mašinac players
KK Partizan players
Riesen Ludwigsburg players
Serbian expatriate basketball people in France
Serbian expatriate basketball people in Germany
Serbian expatriate basketball people in Hungary
Serbian expatriate basketball people in Israel
Serbian expatriate basketball people in Norway
Serbian expatriate basketball people in Poland
Serbian expatriate basketball people in Slovenia
Serbian expatriate basketball people in Tunisia
Serbian expatriate basketball people in North Macedonia
Serbian men's basketball players
Sportspeople from Novi Pazar
Centers (basketball)
Power forwards (basketball)